Teulisna harmani is a moth in the family Erebidae. It was described by Jeremy Daniel Holloway in 2001. It is found on Borneo, Java and Bali. The habitat consists of upper montane forests.

References

Moths described in 2001
harmani